Het Hogeland is a municipality in the north of the province of Groningen in the northeast of the Netherlands.

History 
The municipality of Het Hogeland was established on 1 January 2019 by merging the municipalities of Bedum, De Marne, Eemsmond and Winsum.

Geography 

The population centers in the municipality are: Broek, Eemshaven, Eenrum, Ellerhuizen, Eppenhuizen, Hornhuizen, Houwerzijl, Kantens, Kleine Huisjes, Kloosterburen, Kruisweg, Lauwersoog, Leens, Mensingeweer, Molenrij, Niekerk, Noordwolde, Oldenzijl, Onderdendam, Oosteinde, Oosternieland, Oudeschip, Pieterburen, Roodeschool, Rottum, Schouwerzijl, Startenhuizen, Stitswerd, Uithuizen, Uithuizermeeden, Ulrum, Usquert, Vierhuizen, Warfhuizen, Warffum, Wehe-den Hoorn, Westerdijkshorn, Westernieland, Zandeweer, Zoutkamp, Zuidwolde and Zuurdijk.

Government 
Henk Jan Bolding of the Christian Democratic Appeal (CDA) is mayor of Het Hogeland.

Transport 
The Sauwerd–Roodeschool railway connects the railway stations at Warffum, Usquert, Uithuizen, Uithuizermeeden and Roodeschool to Groningen railway station and the rest of the Dutch railway network.

Notable people

Public thinking & Public Service 

 Rodolphus Agricola (ca.1443 in Baflo – 1485) a pre-Erasmian humanist, Hebrew scholar, educator, musician and builder of a church organ
 Wigbolt, Baron Ripperda (ca.1535 in Winsum – 1573) city governor of Haarlem when the city was under siege in the Eighty Years' War
 Willem Surenhuis (c.1664 in Rottum – 1729) a Dutch Christian scholar of Hebrew
 Hendrik Bulthuis (1865 in Warffum – 1945) a Dutch customs official, author and translator of more than thirty works into Esperanto
 Gezina van der Molen (1892 in Baflo - 1978) legal scholar and resistance fighter during WW11
 Cornelis Simon Meijer (1904 in Pieterburen – 1974) a Dutch mathematician and academic
 Sicco Mansholt (1908 in Ulrum – 1995) a Dutch politician and diplomat
 Aldert van der Ziel (1910 in Zandeweer – 1991) a Dutch physicist who studied electronic noise processes
 Molly Geertsema (1918–1991) politician and jurist, Mayor of Warffum 1953-1957
 Martin Zijlstra (1944 in Eenrum – 2014) a Dutch politician
 Gert Hekma (born 1951 in Bedum) a Dutch anthropologist, sociologist and academic
 Klaas Knot (born 1967 in Bedum) a Dutch economist, President of the Dutch central bank De Nederlandsche Bank

The Arts 

 Hermanus Numan (1744 in Ezinge – 1820) painter, draftsman, pastellist, etcher, engraver, watercolorist, art theorist and publisher
 Hendrik Nicolaas Werkman (1882 in Leens – 1945) an experimental Dutch artist, typographer and printer
 Frits Peutz (1896 in Uithuizen – 1974) architect 
 Seth Gaaikema (1939 in Uithuizen – 2014) cabaret artist, writer, and lyricist
 Ede Staal (1941 in Warffum – 1986) a Dutch singer-songwriter, sang mainly in Gronings dialect
 Freek de Jonge (born 1944 in Westernieland) a Dutch cabaret performer and writer

Sport  
 Arjen Robben (born 1984 in Bedum) professional footballer for FC Bayern Munich and the Netherlands national football team with 420 and 96 caps respectively
 Ranomi Kromowidjojo (born 1990 in Sauwerd) Dutch swimmer, triple Olympic champion

References

External links 

  

 
Municipalities of Groningen (province)
Municipalities of the Netherlands established in 2019